Govind Padmasoorya (born 16 June 1987), popularly known as GP is an Indian television presenter actor who works mainly in Malayalam cinema and a few Telugu films. He made his debut in the movie Atayalangal directed by M. G. Sasi.

He is popular among Malayali audiences through the reality show D 4 Dance. He directed a featured film for Malayalam television channel Asianet  for their 25 years celebration..

Early and personal life
Govind Padmasoorya popularly known as GP was born on June 16, 1987 at Pattambi, as the son of Govind Menon, (Bank Manager, CSB) and Malathy (AGM, BSNL). He completed his graduate in Master of Business Administration in St.Aloysius College in Manglore. Later, he went to Whistling Woods International to complete his media studies. He has a younger brother named Govind Amrithsoorya.

Career 
GP started his career in acting through some albums in 2007. He made his debut in Malayalam cinema as the protagonist in Atayalangal, directed by M. G. Sasi and produced by Aravind Venugopal. The film was based on the life and literature of the writer Nandanar. The film won five Kerala State Film Awards including Best Film.
Next, GP portrayed the role of Vinu, the brother of the IG (Suresh Gopi) in B. Unnikrishnan's IG, who transforms from a loving brother to a ruthless terrorist towards the end of the movie. He was also cast as Sreekanth, an Indian cricketer, in Daddy Cool. Then on he did lead roles in many films including 32aam Adhyayam 23aam Vaakyam along with Lal & Miya directed by Arjun Prabhakaran and Gokul Ramakrishnan.
He played a zumba dancer in his latest film Pretham directed by Ranjith Shanker. He was shot to fame hosting the super hit reality show D 4 Dance in Mazhavil Manorama. He also won the Kerala state award for hosting the show Adi Mone Buzzer in Asianet. He has portrayed antihero in his debut Tamil movie Kee with Jiiva. He has also acted in music albums like Monjulla Painkili and Kumkumam. He also started Ad Film Direction.

Filmography

Television
TV shows

Online

Awards
Won
 JC award 2007 for best debut actor 
 ALA film award 2008 for best new face
Asiavision Awards 2014 – Best Anchor for D2
Asianet Television Awards 2016 – Best Anchor (Male) for Adi Mone Buzzer:Fastest Family First
 Kerala State Television Awards 2016 – Best Anchor for Adi Mone Buzzer: Fastest Family First
 Kerala State Television Awards 2017 – Best Anchor for Adi Mone Buzzer: Fastest Family First
2018 : JCI young personality of the year
Nominated
 Flowers TV awards 2017 – Best Anchor for Adi Mone Buzzer: Fastest Family First

References

External links
 

Male actors in Malayalam cinema
Living people
1985 births
Male actors from Palakkad
Indian male film actors
21st-century Indian male actors
Male actors in Malayalam television
Indian male television actors